100 Days to Heaven is a 2011 Philippine fantasy comedy drama television series directed by Malu L. Sevilla, Jojo A. Saguin, and Don M. Cuaresma. The series stars Coney Reyes and Xyriel Manabat as Anna Manalastas, and Jodi Sta. Maria as Sophia Delgado and Trisha Manalastas, with an ensemble cast consisting of Joel Torre, Dominic Ochoa, Smokey Manaloto, Valerie Concepcion, Rafael Rosell, Jewel Mische, Emmanuelle Vera, Neil Coleta, Louise Abuel, Rustica Carpio, and Noel Trinidad in their supporting roles. The series premiered on ABS-CBN's Primetime Bida evening block and worldwide on TFC from May 9 to November 18, 2011 replacing Mutya and was replaced by Ikaw ay Pag-Ibig.

This is Coney Reyes' first lead role after having already portrayed supporting roles in  such as Sa Puso Ko Iingatan Ka, Ysabella and Rubi.

Series overview

Premise
Anna Manalastas (Coney Reyes) is the dictator of a toy company that she built. In the past, she was a smart and talented little girl who never saw her mother. Her father mistreats and threatens her whenever she tries to impress him, although the actions of her father were out of discipline. She got pregnant later in her life, and for this her father got very mad. At her father's deathbed, she was taught how humans can never be capable of goodness.

After giving birth, Anna gave her daughter away since she didn't think she could adequately raise the child and provide proper love and support for her. She then grows up to be mean, selfish, obnoxious and greedy due to her troubled past. Later on she was killed in a car explosion, an orchestrated "accident" which was planned by her most trusted employee's ( Bobby) wife, Miranda. As she was about to be condemned to hell, Tagabantay, the gatekeeper of heaven, gives her a second chance after bargaining. She gets a chance to live again and make amends with those whom she wronged while still alive, but as a child, and for only 100 days.

In her quest for redemption, she'll be helped by people she thought were insignificant, and eventually run into her own daughter who will prove crucial to her own mission. Little did she know also that aside from changing for the greater good, Anna was also sent back to life in the last days of her moment, to also find love and peace that was never been given to her on her early days, including to discover who is her real daughter.

Cast and characters

Main cast
 Coney Reyes as Madame Anna Manalastas (Age 56) - The protagonist. Anna is the evil and ruthless former owner of the Toy Company. After her death, Tagabantay tells her that she cannot enter heaven because of all the bad things she did in her life. Fortunately, Tagabantay gives her a second chance to correct her past mistakes by returning to Earth in her childhood form. Once she's back on Earth, she meets Kevin, a young boy who has a sister, Sophia who later reveals to be her daughter. With the help of Sophia Delgado and her family, she must find all the people she hurt and correct what she's done in her past life. Over time, she'll learn to feel love and life values she hadn't known before because of her tragic past. She made Sophia Delgado enter her company as Sophia Mendoza, a marketing consultant for her mission. While finding for her daughter that she abandoned, she secretly followed a lead, her old maid, Digna, revealing, Sophia Delgado is her biological daughter. In the end, she learned the real meaning of love, forgiveness, and sacrifice.
 Xyriel Manabat as Young Anna Manalastas (Age 7) - She is evil and snobbish at first but learns to change for the good when Tagabantay gave her second chance to come back to Earth and her younger self will serve as her vessel. While doing her mission on earth, she will be able to meet Sophia Delgado and her family through Kevin, Sophia's step brother to be revealed. As she stays with their family and sees their condition, she offers her a big amount of money, but Sophia needing to help her with her mission. While she does her mission with her, she develops a good relationship with Sophia and her "cousins", Bruce and Jopet. She voices another girl at the end of the last episode.
 Shaina Magdayao as Teen/Young Adult Anna Manalastas (Age 21)
 Jodi Sta. Maria as Sophia Manalastas Mosqueda/Trisha Manalastas/Sophia Mendoza - A good character. She agrees to help Anna by having a false identity and work at The Toy Company. Over the days, she'll learn to know Anna Manalastas and be her best friend. Little does she know that she is the multi-million dollar heiress to her biological mother's inheritance. She will eventually learn who her biological mother is and if she's willing to accept her inheritance her biological mother's company. In the end, she learns to forgive and accept her biological mother, even before her mother was able to accomplish her mission and enter the gates of heaven. She was able to get the company that her mother worked for and had a happy ever after with Bart and her adoptive father, Andres.

Supporting cast
 Dominic Ochoa as Bobby Ramirez† - Bobby is the main antagonist and Anna's former assistant in The Toy Company, where he once worked as a carrier of goods. The day before he died, he seeks forgiveness from Anna for his resentment against her. He entered Heaven after. Anna reunited with him in the ending part of the series.
 Enrique Gil as Teen Bobby Ramirez†
 Smokey Manaloto as Bruce Lim† - Bruce is one of Sophia's kind hearted and bubbly street cousins, together with Jopet. Later on, he was killed by Baldo. In the end, he and Anna reunited in Heaven.
 Valerie Concepcion as Miranda Salviejo-Ramirez - Miranda is the main antagonist and Bobby's wife who is the mastermind of killing Anna.
 Vangie Martelle as Teen Miranda Salviejo
 Rafael Rosell as Bartolome "Bart" Ramirez Jr. - He is the younger brother of Bobby. Bobby stood as Bart's foster father when their parents died. Idolizing Bobby as his idol, he has been following all his life what Bobby wants. Even if he loves music, he still chose to work for Anna because Bobby put him there as a midlevel manager. However, Anna thinks  Bart is worthless as a manager in her company. He fell in love with Sophia Mendoza, the fake marketing expert of The Toy Company, and later to be revealed as legal heiress of all Madame Anna's wealth. In the middle of the series, he knew the truth about Sophia's true identity, but kept it as a secret to Bobby and Miranda. In the end, he had a happily ever after with Sophia.
 Joel Torre as Andres Delgado - Andres is a very loving father to Sophia and Kevin. Despite his handicap, he still works to earn a living to help augment their daily needs. In the middle of the series, it was revealed that Andres is Sophia's adoptive father.
 Neil Coleta as Jopet Lim - Jopet is one of Sophia's street smart cousins. Together with Bruce, they are Sophia's accomplices in her scams. He fell in love with Yannie, Bobby and Bart Ramirez's younger sister, even if he can't because of Madame Anna's mission.
 Louise Abuel as Kevin Delgado† - Kevin is a very active kid. He is full of hope, which he shares with the people around him. At a young age, he already knows that his time on Earth may come sooner than expected. This is the reason why he is looking for a man who will love and take care of Sophia. One night, he saved Anna, his best friend, who was supposed to be the one hit by a car, which causes his death. In the end of the series, he and Madame Anna got reunited in heaven.
 Noel Trinidad as Tagabantay/Saint Peter - He was the one who gave Anna the task of giving Anna a second chance to correct her past mistakes before ascending to Heaven within a hundred days.
 Coco Martin as Young Tagabantay
 Jewel Mische as Jessica Cruz - Jessica is the secondary antagonist and fiancé of Bart in the series. She hates Sophia and Anna. She plans to marry Bart, but failed due to Bart falling for Sophia instead. Then, she planned to kill Sophia so that Bart could marry her. In the middle of the series, she did everything not knowingly in the beginning that Sophia is her cousin, the legal heiress of Madame Anna's wealth, to not get the company of Madame Anna. The time Sophia sold the company to Ramirez's couple and knew she is not the true heiress of Madame Anna's company and wealth, she was kicked out of the company. In the end, she went to Europe for her to start a new life again.
 Emmanuelle Vera as Yanie Ramirez - Yanie is a sweet beautiful girl in the series. She was the youngest of the Ramirez children and is in love with Jopet.
 Rustica Carpio as Lola Kayang Lim - She is a good, loving, and sometimes a funny grandmother to Bruce and Jopet.

Guest cast
 Lui Manansala as Brenda
 Mark Gil† as Norman Manalastas† - The strict father of Anna, who was responsible for mistreating her out of discipline since childhood that his influence made her a cold and selfish tyrant. He died shortly before the events of the series present-time, and because he did not appeared in the finale, it is implied that he was sent to hell as punishment for destroying his daughter's childhood and happiness, prior to the error of her ways.
 Pokwang as Digna Amparo† - Anna's maid. She was asked by Anna to give her child up for adoption. She gave the child to her friend, Teresita, to raise as her own child. She died in episode 90 and never appeared in the series finale in heaven. 
 Melai Cantiveros as Girlie. She is the previous maid of Anna that got fired because of not waking up Anna before the alarm clock rings.
 Vice Ganda as August - A hairdresser who was fired in the salon where he works because he didn't do his job on Anna. He owns a beauty parlor and his friends became his employees. However, because he idolizes Anna, he became a strict boss to his friends because he wanted to be like Anna. But, because of Anna, he learned the value of friendship.
 Gloria Romero as Lola Pilar† - An old lady selling sampaguita along the Church who was mocked by Anna in the first episode. She is also the adoptive grandmother of Tikoy. However, she died in a car accident. She didn't appear in the series finale in heaven.
 Jason Abalos as Brando Rivero. He is the previous driver of Anna that got fired because of texting while driving. His daughter died in episode 5 during surgery.
 Chinggoy Alonzo† as Mr. Villanueva - An owner of V-Toys company who died in episode 14. He never appeared in the series finale in heaven.
 Xian Lim as Jojo Villanueva - Mr. Villanueva's son
 Sam Milby as Ruel Villanueva - Mr. Villanueva's son
 Empress Schuck as Gina Bernardo - A former employee of The Toy Company. She got fired after a mistake that she did while Anna is in a meeting with Mr. Villanueva. After she got fired, she suffered a miscarriage. This led to becoming a beggar in the streets.
 Ron Morales as Baldomero "Baldo" Enriquez - One of Miranda's men behind the planned death of Anna.
 Vhong Navarro as Elpidio "Pido" Abucay - One of The Toy Company's former employees. He was fired after he was accused of stealing. He is trying to make a living by performing as a clown.
 Matt Evans as Paul - Gina's Husband and the father of the baby that he and Gina lost because of a miscarriage of the baby. Later on, they separated as a married couple.
 Joonee Gamboa as Ricardo "Carding" Torres - One of The Toy Company's most loyal employee. He is also Anna's most trusted employee. However, he is illiterate. Anna promised to promote him to Messenger, on condition that he must learn to read and write. He struggled to learn how to read and write. However, it was too late. 
 Maricar Reyes as Emerald Capistrano - Daughter of Julio. She want to take revenge of Anna because of what happened to his father. Later on, they will get the royalties from Princess Emerald action figure and will forgive herself for their misery.
 Abby Bautista as Young Emerald Caspitrano
 Celine Lim as Pre-teen Emerald Capistrano
 Ricardo Cepeda as Julio Capistrano - He sold his Princess Emerald design for low price. With the popularity of Princess Emerald action figure, he ask for royalties but Anna insists that there is no agreement about it and it is not applicable for Third World Countries like Philippines. He then resent Anna for outsmarting him.
 Tirso Cruz III as Rene Mosqueda† - Anna's ex-boyfriend and the biological father of Sophia Delgado. He didn't want responsibility for Anna's child so he left her to go back to the States. He is also Carmen's husband. He died in episode 40 and never appeared in the series finale in heaven.
 Felix Roco as Teen Rene Mosqueda†
 Liz Alindogan as Carmen Mosqueda
 Eda Nolan as Teen Carmen Mosqueda
 Cherry Pie Picache as Myrna Soledad - She is the owner of Three Angels Flower Shop. However, her business declined after Anna slandered her because of a mistake. This after they delivered a funeral flower to a valuable client. Because of what happened, she decided to take her children away from her.
 Cheska Billiones as Claire Soledad - The eldest daughter of Myrna. She was adopted by Myrna's aunt. She had hard feelings with her mother.
 Jelo Eschaluce as Bryan Soledad - Myrna's only son. Mynra gave him to her sister Ibyang. However, Ibyang refused to give him and he suffered abuses from Ibyang and her lover.
 Veronica Louise Bernardo as Margaret Soledad - Myrna's youngest daughter. She was adopted by her adopted parents. 
 Yda Yaneza as Ibyang
 Gloria Diaz as Dolores Bustamante - Rachel's adopted mother
 Rica Peralejo as Rachel Bustamante - Anna assumed that Rachel was her long lost daughter but she wasn't her biological daughter. 
 Ogie Escanilla as Onin Abucay
 Khaycee Aboloc as Katkat Abucay
 Lui Villaluz as Marjorie
 Christopher De Leon as Ronaldo Quinio
 Albie Casiño as Reggie Quinio
 Carlo Lacana as Young Reggie Quinio
 Angel Jacob as Dorothy Quinio
 Racquel Villavicencio as Minda
 Aria Clemente as Cielo
 William Lorenzo as Fidel
 Yayo Aguila as Teresita Delgado† - She didn't appear in the series finale in heaven.
 Jayson Gainza as Eloy
 Tess Antonio as Minerva - Eloy's girlfriend
 Ivan Dorschner as Teen Bart Ramirez
 Bugoy Cariño as Tikoy 
 Agot Isidro as Nurse Diana - She took care of Tikoy's grandmother at the hospital where she worked at not knowing her name nor did she know she had any family, a grandson named Tikoy. She adopts Tikoy because his grandmother died. 
 Albert Martinez as Tagabantay (a postman)
 Franco Daza as Dexter Alarcon
 Kiray Celis as Young Girlie
 Judy Ann Santos as Tagabantay (a chef)
 John Lloyd Cruz as PO3 Jack De Guzman - He is a police officer that first know about Anna's biological daughter identity and Anna's hidden existence as a child.
 Dante Rivero as Gen. Salazar
 Gerard Pizarras as Joey Salazar
 KC Concepcion as Tagabantay (a streetsweeper)
 Paulo Avelino as Teddy Ledesma - The chief executive officer of Teddy's Burger Corporation. He is a happy-go-lucky guy. He would soon found out that his uncle Walter is embezzling money from the company. However, he didn't file charges against Walter because he became his second father after his father died.
 Philip Salvador as Walter Ledesma - Teddy's uncle. He was envious at Teddy because his brother inherited it. He dedicated his whole life for the company with his brother and never got married. He admits that he terminated Teddy because of being selfish. 
 Jericho Rosales as Tagabantay (a security guard)
 Angelica Panganiban as Claire - An inmate with Sophia. She got released with the help of Sophia and Bart.
 Tetchie Agbayani as Claire's Mother
 Ronaldo Valdez as Atty. Galileo "Leo" Fonacier - The corporate lawyer of The Toy Company. Anna hired him because of his good performance, this after Anna fired her lawyer after they lost in a settlement.
 Piolo Pascual as Dr. Ivan Carlos - Specialist as a pedestrian surgeon. He was recommended to operate on Kevin because Kevin got hit by a car. He also has a fear of operating on another child because his daughter didn't survive the surgery. 
 Dimples Romana as Angela Carlos - wife of Dr. Ivan Carlos
 Angel Locsin as Tagabantay (a nurse)
 Susan Roces† as Amelita Manalastas Salvador† - Anna and Cecille's mother & Sophia's grandmother. She reunites with Anna in heaven.
 Eddie Gutierrez as Mr. Salvador - Anna's stepfather.
 Rita Avila as Cecille Salvador - Anna's half- sister
 Anne Curtis as Tagabantay (a protester)
 Richard Gomez as Tagabantay (an ice cream vendor)
 Vilma Santos as Tagabantay (a memorial park official)
 Pen Medina as Tagasundo - a demon who wants to send Anna into hell.
 Jake Cuenca as Young Tagasundo

Reception

Ratings
100 Days premiered with a 32.1% rating based on Kantar Media Ratings. Since then, the show has been a constant top-rater on its timeslot. On its series finale, the show garnered an impressive 38.7%. According to a survey done by Kantar Media Data, 100 Days, along with fellow ABS-CBN show, Minsan Lang Kita Iibigin, was the most watched program for the third quarter of 2011.

Awards and nominations
....

Reruns
On March 14, 2020, ABS-CBN announced that 100 Days to Heaven will be re-airing on Primetime Bida beginning on March 16, 2020, temporarily replacing Pamilya Ko as part of the network's special programming block during the Enhanced community quarantine in Luzon done to stop the spread of the COVID-19 pandemic in the Philippines which necessitated the network to suspend teleserye tapings. However, the re-runs were moved to 5:05 pm as the network decided to give the timeslot to a rerun of Meteor Garden's 2018 remake. This rerun was abruptly cut due to the temporary closure of ABS-CBN following the cease and desist order issued by the National Telecommunications Commission on account of its franchise expiration. It also had a rerun in 2015 on YouTube which includes all 140 episodes.

See also
List of programs broadcast by ABS-CBN
Xyriel Manabat

References

External links

ABS-CBN website
 

ABS-CBN drama series
Television series by Dreamscape Entertainment Television
Fantaserye and telefantasya
2011 Philippine television series debuts
2011 Philippine television series endings
Angels in television
Filipino-language television shows
Television shows set in the Philippines
2010s children's television series
Christian children's television series